The 2013 Eastern Washington Eagles football team represented Eastern Washington University in the 2013 NCAA Division I FCS football season. The team was coached by Beau Baldwin, who was in his sixth season with Eastern Washington. The Eagles played their home games at Roos Field in Cheney, Washington and were a member of the Big Sky Conference. They finished with a record of 11–3, 8–0 in Big Sky play to win the capture the Big Sky Regular season title. They qualify for the FCS playoffs which they defeated South Dakota State in the second round, Jacksonville State in the quarterfinals before losing to Towson in the semifinals.

Schedule

Source: Official Schedule

Game summaries

@ Oregon State

The Eagles upset of AP #25 Oregon State is only the fourth time ever that a ranked FBS team has been beaten by an FCS program.

Western Oregon

@ Toledo

@ Sam Houston State

Last seasons meeting was in the FCS Playoffs.

Weber State

@ North Dakota

Southern Utah

@ Montana

@ Idaho State

Montana State

@ Cal Poly

Portland State

Ranking movements

References

Eastern Washington
Eastern Washington Eagles football seasons
Big Sky Conference football champion seasons
Eastern Washington
Eastern Washington Eagles football